Dream.org is a non-profit co-founded by Van Jones, Jessica Jackson, and Matt Haney that focuses on addressing mass incarceration, climate change, and poverty by advocating for new legislation, creating green jobs, and teaching low-income children how to code.

History
Jessica Jackson and Matt Haney met Van Jones during a chance meeting and began talking with him about criminal justice reform. Over breakfast they scribbled ideas on a napkin which later led to the formation of #cut50.

In 2015, Jackson, Haney, and Jones joined to co-found #cut50, an organization focused on bipartisan solutions to criminal justice reform issues. As #cut50, Dream Corps worked alongside members of Congress, and the Trump Administration to develop and pass the First Step Act of 2018.

Dream Corps TECH
Dream Corps TECH started as #YesWeCode in early 2015 alongside Rebuild the Dream. The organization works to teach low-income kids how to code.

References

Criminal justice reform
Non-profit organizations based in the United States
Prison reform